Herbert Osborne Badger (4 October 1882 – 16 March 1965) was an English footballer who played as a wing half. He was also employed at various times as a professional violinist and in later life as a publican.

Early life 
Badger was born in Islington, London, the son of George Badger (1840–1905), a professional musician, and Elizabeth Dalton (née Rose) (1841–1913). He attended Great College Street School, Westminster and was later trained to play the violin, receiving tuition from renowned violist and teacher Lionel Tertis. When his father moved the family to Brighton in order to take up the role of orchestra leader of the Alhambra Music Hall, Badger was employed for a short time as an orchestral violinist at the West Pier.

Move to Clacton 
When his father took over running the day resort, Rigg's Retreat in Clacton, Badger would help with the general day-to-day running. But, rather than fulfil his father's ultimate intentions for a musical career, Badger followed his own passion for football.

Career

Badger started his career in Essex, playing for Clacton Town (as a contemporary of Vivian J Woodward), Colchester Town and Ilford. He joined Tottenham Hotspur as an amateur in November 1903 and turned professional 10 months later with Football League side Woolwich Arsenal. However, Badger was unable to break into the first team, and left to join Hertfordshire club Watford in August 1906 without playing a first team game. Badger made 54 Southern League appearances while at Cassio Road, scoring 5 times, and also played twice in the FA Cup. He left Watford to join Brentford in 1908 and Nottingham Forest the following year. At Forest, Badger finally played in the Football League.

First World War 
Badger was first employed during the war as a special constable and then served with the Royal Garrison Artillery at Harwich. During the war he stayed an enthusiastic amateur sportsman and during an inter-services football match he captained the Army side against one from the Royal Navy on the Parkeston ground. He was also a keen cricketer and played up to minor county standard. While in the Army he played a match against Test cricketer Frank Woolley.

Later life 
After war service, Badger formed a dance band called Hava Band and was later installed as manager of the Carlton Hotel, Clacton in May 1939, taking over the licence from his son, James, who was called up for war service in 1940. He retired in 1959.

Badger died in Colchester in 1965.

References

1882 births
1965 deaths
Military personnel from London
Footballers from Islington (district)
English footballers
Association football wing halves
F.C. Clacton players
Colchester Town F.C. players
Ilford F.C. players
Tottenham Hotspur F.C. players
Arsenal F.C. players
Watford F.C. players
Brentford F.C. players
Nottingham Forest F.C. players
Southern Football League players
English Football League players
British Army personnel of World War I
Royal Garrison Artillery soldiers